The England national cricket team toured the West Indies from January to April 1948 and played four Test matches against the West Indies cricket team. The first two Tests were drawn and West Indies won the last two to take the series 2–0. England were captained by Gubby Allen, though Ken Cranston was stand-in skipper in the first Test. West Indies began with George Headley as captain but he was badly injured in the first Test and replaced for the rest of the series by John Goddard.

Test series summary

First Test

Second Test

Third Test

Fourth Test

England squad
 Batsmen – Len Hutton, Jack Robertson, Joe Hardstaff junior, Dennis Brookes, Winston Place, Gerald Smithson
 Pace/seam bowlers – Gubby Allen (captain), Harold Butler, Maurice Tremlett
 Spinners – Jim Laker, Johnny Wardle
 All-rounders – Ken Cranston (vice-captain), Dick Howorth, Jack Ikin
 Wicketkeepers – Godfrey Evans, Billy Griffith

References

Sources
 CricketArchive — tour summary
 Playfair Cricket Annual, 1st edition, 1948
 Wisden Online — 1948
 Wisden Cricketers' Almanack, 85th edition, 1948

1948 in English cricket
1948 in West Indian cricket
West Indian cricket seasons from 1945–46 to 1969–70
1947-48
International cricket competitions from 1945–46 to 1960